Dilhorne Park railway station is a heritage railway station in Staffordshire on the Foxfield Railway. The station is a halt set in woodland, and at 760 feet above sea level offers fine views across the Staffordshire Moorlands. This station was the setting of "Hanbury Halt" in the BBC costume drama Cranford.

Heritage railway stations in Staffordshire
Railway stations built for UK heritage railways